Rugby sevens at the 2018 Commonwealth Games was held on the Gold Coast, Australia from April 13 to 15. The rugby sevens competition was held at Robina Stadium. This is the sixth time that the men's competition was held, following rugby sevens's debut at the 1998 Games, with women's rugby sevens  making its debut. A total of sixteen men's and eight women's teams are scheduled to compete (312 athletes, at 12 per team plus one traveling reserve) in each respective tournament.

Competition schedule

The following is the competition schedule for the Rugby sevens competitions:

Medal table

Medalists

Qualification
A total of sixteen men's teams and eight women's team will qualify to compete at the games. Each nation may enter one team in each tournament (12 athletes per team plus one traveling reserve) for a maximum total of 26 athletes.

Men's competition

Women’s competition

Participating nations
There are 16 participating nations at the rugby sevens competitions with a total of 312 athletes.

References

External links
 Results Book – Rugby Sevens

 
Rugby sevens
2018
Rugby sevens competitions in Australia
2018 rugby sevens competitions
International rugby union competitions hosted by Australia